Mahendra Morang Adarsh Multiple Campus is a constituent campus of Tribhuvan University in Biratnagar, Morang. Established in 1955 as 'Morang Intermediate College', it is one of the oldest constituent campuses of Tribhuvan University in the district. There are 165 academic staffsand 3234 students studying in the college. On 15 April 2018, Tribhuvan University elected the college administration led by Dr. Babu Ram Timalsina, who is often referred to as "Campus Chief".

History
Mahendra Morang Adarsha Multiple Campus is the constituent campus of Tribhuvan University in Province No. 1. It was established in 2012 B.S. as 'Morang Intermediate College' and it has come a long way since then. In the very first year of its establishment, the campus was able to record hundred percent result in the faculty of humanities. Established before Tribhuvan University, Mahendra Morang Adarsh Multiple Campus has a notable history for serving the education in Nepal. The construction of the campus building completed in 2018 B.S. After the inauguration of the building in 2020 B.S. by King Mahendra, the word "Mahendra" was added to the name of the campus in 2020 B.S. being Mahendra Morang College. With the implementation of new education system in 2028 B.S., Tribhuvan University converted it into its constituent campus. After merging with Adarsh Mahabidhyalaya, the campus was named as Mahendra Morang Adarsh Multiple Campus.

Academics
The campus offers following bachelor's and master's degree courses:
Bachelor's degree
Bachelor of Science
Bachelor of Information Technology (B.IT)
Bachelor of Science in Computer Science and Information Technology
Bachelor of Arts
Bachelor of Business Studies
Bachelor of Computer Applications
Bachelor of Education
Bachelor of Business Administration
Bachelor of Public Administration
B.Sc Microbiology
Master's degree
M.Sc in Physics
M. Sc. in Chemistry
M. Sc. in Microbiology
Master of Public Administration
MBS
M.A. in English
Master of Education

Notable alumni
Some of the eminent graduates of the college include:
Bidhya Devi Bhandari, 2nd President of Nepal
Sushila Karki, 24th Chief Justice of the Supreme Court of Nepal
Shekhar Koirala

See also
 List of universities and colleges in Nepal

References

Tribhuvan University
1955 establishments in Nepal